(born May 13, 1965) is a video game director, game designer and producer who works for Nintendo. Since 2015, Konno works as a manager at Nintendo EPD, more precisely on the Smart Device Group, the department responsible for production of smartphone games.

Biography

Konno joined Nintendo in 1986, where he worked on positions such as assistant director in the beginning of his career, along with being the director for games such as Super Mario Kart and Super Mario World 2: Yoshi's Island.

Around the beginning of the 2000s, he became the group manager of his own department at Nintendo EAD, where he produced games such as Nintendogs, Mario Kart DS and Mario Kart Wii. Konno also went on to become the producer for the Nintendo DS's successor, the Nintendo 3DS. After this, he produced the games Nintendogs + Cats, Mario Kart 7 and Mario Kart 8 for Nintendo EAD.

In 2015, Konno began managing Nintendo's mobile projects on his own production group at Nintendo Entertainment Planning & Development, the division resulting from the merger of Nintendo's main development and production divisions.

Works

Interviews

Iwata Asks: Mario Kart Wii - Development Staff Interview

References

1965 births
Japanese video game designers
Living people
Nintendo people
Japanese video game producers
Japanese video game directors